In Boolean logic, the term implicant has either a generic or a particular meaning.  In the generic use, it refers to the hypothesis of an implication (implicant).  In the particular use, a product term (i.e., a conjunction of literals) P is an implicant of a Boolean function F, denoted  , if P implies F (i.e., whenever P takes the value 1 so does F).
For instance, implicants of the function

as well as some others.

Prime implicant 
A prime implicant of a function is an implicant (in the above particular sense) that cannot be covered by a more general, (more reduced, meaning with fewer literals) implicant. W. V. Quine defined a prime implicant to be an implicant that is minimal—that is, the removal of any literal from P results in a non-implicant for F.  Essential prime implicants (also known as core prime implicants) are prime implicants that cover an output of the function that no combination of other prime implicants is able to cover.

From the latter, multiple literals can be removed to make it prime:

,  and  can be removed, yielding .
Alternatively,  and  can be removed, yielding .
Finally,  and  can be removed, yielding .

The process of removing literals from a Boolean term is called expanding the term. Expanding by one literal doubles the number of input combinations for which the term is true (in binary Boolean algebra).

The sum of all prime implicants of a Boolean function is called its complete sum, minimal covering sum, or  Blake canonical form.

See also
 Quine–McCluskey algorithm
 Karnaugh map
 Petrick's method

References

External links
 Slides explaining implicants, prime implicants and essential prime implicants
 Examples of finding essential prime implicants using K-map

Boolean algebra